Mauro Testa (19 February 1947 – 29 July 2021) was an Italian yacht racer who competed in the 1972 Summer Olympics. He died on 29 July 2021, at the age of 74.

References

1947 births
2021 deaths
Italian male sailors (sport)
Olympic sailors of Italy
Sailors at the 1972 Summer Olympics – Star